The 2019 World Mixed Doubles Curling Championship was held in Stavanger, Norway from April 20 to 27, 2019. The event was held in conjunction with the 2019 World Senior Curling Championships. A record forty-eight nations competed in the event, including Kosovo, Mexico, Nigeria, Saudi Arabia, and Ukraine competing in their first World Curling Federation events.

The 2019 edition was the last with open entry. The top sixteen teams in the competition, in addition to qualifying for the playoffs, qualified for the 2020 World Championship. The remaining four spots will be awarded at the new World Mixed Doubles Qualification Event.

Teams
The teams are as follows:

Round-robin standings
The top two teams in each group qualify for the playoffs.

Final round-robin standings

Rankings are determined by head-to-head record, where applicable, then DSC within their group.

Ranking of third-placed teams
Of the six teams placing third in their respective groups, the four with the lowest Draw Shot Challenge score will qualify for the playoffs.

Round-robin results
All draw times are listed in Central European Summer Time (UTC+2).

Draw 1
Saturday, 20 April, 09:00

Draw 2
Saturday, 20 April, 12:30

Draw 3
Saturday, 20 April, 16:30

Draw 4
Saturday, 20 April, 20:00

Draw 5
Sunday, 21 April, 08:00

Draw 6
Sunday, 21 April, 11:15

Draw 7
Sunday, 21 April, 14:30

Draw 8
Sunday, 21 April, 17:45

Draw 9
Sunday, 21 April, 21:00

Draw 10
Monday, 22 April, 08:00

Draw 11
Monday, 22 April, 11:15

Draw 12
Monday, 22 April, 14:30

Draw 13
Monday, 22 April, 17:45

Draw 14
Monday, 22 April, 21:00

Draw 15
Tuesday, 23 April, 08:00

Draw 16
Tuesday, 23 April, 11:15

Draw 17
Tuesday, 23 April, 14:30

Draw 18
Tuesday, 23 April, 17:45

Draw 19
Tuesday, 23 April, 21:00

Draw 20
Wednesday, 24 April, 08:00

Draw 21
Wednesday, 24 April, 11:15

Draw 22
Wednesday, 24 April, 14:30

Draw 23
Wednesday, 24 April, 17:45

Draw 24
Wednesday, 24 April, 21:00

Draw 25
Thursday, 25 April, 09:00

Draw 26
Thursday, 25 April, 12:30

^ Belgium forfeited the game.

Draw 27
Thursday, 25 April, 16:00

Draw 28
Thursday, 25 April, 19:30

Playoffs

Bracket

Round of 16
Friday, 26 April, 9:00

Friday, 26 April, 13:00

Quarterfinals
Friday, 26 April, 18:00

Semifinals
Saturday, 27 April, 9:00

Bronze medal game
Saturday, 27 April, 13:00

Gold medal game
Saturday, 27 April, 16:00

Final standings

Top 5 Player percentages
Round robin only

References

External links
Official website

International curling competitions hosted by Norway
World Mixed Doubles Curling Championship
Sport in Stavanger
World Mixed Doubles Curling Championship
World Mixed Doubles Curling Championship
World Mixed Doubles Curling Championship